Bruno Henrique Turco, or simply Bruno Turco (born 30 July 1991, in Piracicaba), is a Brazilian defensive midfielder who plays for ABC on loan from Deportivo Maldonado. He played for the Cyprus side Ermis Aradippou.

References

External links
 Profile at Ogol Profile at

1991 births
Living people
Brazilian footballers
Primeira Liga players
Cypriot First Division players
Sociedade Esportiva Palmeiras players
Vitória F.C. players
Deportivo Maldonado players
ABC Futebol Clube players
Ermis Aradippou FC players
Brazilian expatriate footballers
Expatriate footballers in Cyprus
Expatriate footballers in Uruguay
Expatriate footballers in Paraguay
Expatriate footballers in Portugal
Brazilian expatriate sportspeople in Portugal
Brazilian expatriate sportspeople in Cyprus
Association football midfielders
Brazilian expatriate sportspeople in Uruguay
Brazilian expatriate sportspeople in Paraguay
People from Piracicaba
Footballers from São Paulo (state)